In the Blood is the second album by British-American dance band Londonbeat, released on 29 September 1990. It includes the single "I've Been Thinking About You", which reached number 2 in the UK Singles Chart in 1990 and number one on a number of world charts, including the US Billboard Hot 100 the following year.

The album reached number 21 on the US Billboard 200 and number 34 in the UK Albums Chart.

Critical reception
AllMusic editor Jim Smith said, "Whether they're sensitive balladeers making a soulful dance single ("I've Been Thinking About You"), or lewd, jilted lovers making a soulful dance single ("She Broke My Heart (in 36 Places)"), Londonbeat's pleasant harmonies and pumping flow are undeniably catchy. Although their lyrics are sometimes criminally obtuse, In the Blood is a better album, musically, than it's ever been given credit for." Marisa Fox from Entertainment Weekly encouraged, "Check out the foot-stomping "She Broke My Heart (in 36 Places)", inspired by Edwin Starr’s "Twenty-Five Miles"; the churning "It’s in the Blood"; and the exuberant "She Said She Loves Me". Londonbeat’s powerful dance rhythms and soulful blues songs recapture the long-lost spirit of early R&B." Parry Gettelman from Orlando Sentinel highlighted "I've Been Thinking About You" ("Cannibalistic"), "She Said She Loves Me" ("a touch of Prince"), "Getcha Ya Ya" ("zydeco flavor[ed]"), "This Is Your Life" ("a pretty acoustic number with beautiful harmonies"), "Crying in the Rain" ("echoes the Philly sound of the Dramatics") and "No Woman No Cry". He concluded that the band "shows a lot of promise". 

Tom Harrison from The Province wrote, "Virtually perfect balance of old-style soul and modern production techniques resulting in a crafty contemporary dance music that embraces the reggae classic "No Woman No Cry", the Africa-via-New Orleans gumbo of "Getcha Ya Ya", the retro Philly soul of "She Broke My Heart (in 36 Places)" and more. With its second record, Londonbeat jumps ahead of such U.K. contemporaries as The Christians and Brother Beyond." David Bauder from St. Petersburg Times said, "It's not hard to cringe at the thought of a disco version of Bob Marley's "No Woman No Cry", with sampled sounds of whales and dolphins. What's hard is making that idea work. Londonbeat pulls it off, as well as most everything else, in its impressive American debut. [...] In the Blood is a deft mix of dance and hip-hop beats that doesn't skimp on soulful melodies. Led by the hit single, "I've Been Thinking About You", this disc is brimming with clever hooks."

Track listing

UK version 

"Step Inside My Shoes" available on CD versions only. It was also the B-side of the "No Woman, No Cry" single.
On the LP release, track 8 begins side B.

US version

Charts

Weekly charts

Year-end charts

Certifications

Personnel

Londonbeat
Jimmy Helms – lead vocals and backing vocals
Jimmy Chambers – backing vocals
George Chandler – backing vocals
William Henshall – guitars, synthesizers, drum machine and sampler

Additional personnel
Ian Green – synthesizers

References

1990 albums
Londonbeat albums
Albums produced by David A. Stewart
Radioactive Records albums